Charles William Grenfell (17 March 1823 – 4 May 1861) was a British Liberal Party politician.

Background
Grenfell was the eldest son of Charles Grenfell and grandson of Pascoe Grenfell. His mother was Lady Georgiana Frances, daughter of William Molyneux, 2nd Earl of Sefton, while Henry Grenfell was his younger brother. His mother died when he was three years old.

Political career
Grenfell entered Parliament for Sandwich in 1847, a seat he held until 1852. He later represented Windsor between 1852 and 1859.

Family
Grenfell married Georgiana Caroline, daughter of William Lascelles, in 1852. They had three sons and two daughters. His eldest son William Grenfell was also a politician and was raised to the peerage as Baron Desborough in 1905. The family lived at Taplow Court, Taplow, Buckinghamshire. Grenfell died in May 1861, aged 38. Georgiana remained a widow until her death in February 1911.

References

External links

1823 births
1861 deaths
Liberal Party (UK) MPs for English constituencies
UK MPs 1847–1852
UK MPs 1852–1857
UK MPs 1857–1859
British people of Cornish descent
Charles